The Pohuenui River is a river of the Northland Region of New Zealand's North Island. It flows southeast, reaching the Waipu River close to the latter's mouth, immediately north of the town of Waipu.

The New Zealand Ministry for Culture and Heritage gives a translation of "large climbing plant" for Pōhuenui.

See also
List of rivers of New Zealand

References

Rivers of the Northland Region
Rivers of New Zealand